The Wild Scene is a 1970 American drama film directed by William Rowland and starring Alberta Nelson as Dr. Virginia Grant, a female psychiatrist who talks graphically about her tawdriest cases. When she goes underground to investigate her college daughter's sordid activities, she gets drawn into a world of prostitution, orgies, drugs, and more.

Cast
Alberta Nelson as Dr. Virginia Grant
Rita Lupino as Faith
Wendy Stuart as Andrea
Jarl Victor as Dr. Jennings
John Craven as Morton
Berry Kroeger as Tim
Nancy Czar as Clarette

See also
 List of American films of 1970

External links

1970 films
1970 drama films
American drama films
1970s English-language films
Films directed by William Rowland
1970s American films